Minister for Lands is a position in the government of Western Australia, currently held by John Carey of the Labor Party. The position was first created in 1870, under the name Commissioner of Crown Lands, at a time when Western Australia was still a British colony and had not yet achieved responsible government. Exception for a brief period between 2001 and 2003, it has existed in every government since then. The minister is currently responsible for the state government's Land Use Management division comprising part of the Department of Planning, Lands and Heritage, which is responsible for the management of crown land in Western Australia.

Titles
 18 December 1870 – 27 May 1901: Commissioner of Crown Lands
 27 May 1901 – 25 February 1983: Minister for Lands
 25 February 1983 – 25 February 1986: Minister for Lands and Surveys
 25 February 1986 – 16 February 2001: Minister for Lands
 27 June 2003 – 23 September 2008: Minister for Land Information
 23 September 2008 – present: Minister for Lands

List of ministers

See also
 Minister for Agriculture and Food (Western Australia)
 Minister for the Environment (Western Australia)
 Minister for Fisheries (Western Australia)
 Minister for Forestry (Western Australia)
 Minister for Water (Western Australia)
 Surveyor-General of Western Australia
Commissioner of Crown Lands (Australia)

References

 David Black (2014), The Western Australian Parliamentary Handbook (Twenty-Third Edition). Perth [W.A.]: Parliament of Western Australia.

Lands
Minister for Lands